BLC, Blc or blc can refer to:

Code
 Belo Corporation (NYSE stock ticker BLC), a former Texan broadcasting company
 Brasil Central Linhas Aéreas (ICAO airline code BLC), a defunct airline
 × Brassolaeliocattleya (horticultural abbreviation code Blc.), an orchid genus
 Nuxalk language (ISO 639 language code blc), a critically endangered Salish language spoken formerly known as Bella Coola

Initialism abbreviation
 BLC Leather Technology Centre, a British testing, auditing and consulting business

 B lymphocyte chemoattractant (or CXCL13), a chemokine selectively chemotactic for B lymphocytes
 Bachelor of Canon Law, a degree in ecclesiastical studies
 Basic Leader Course, a course of study for non-commissioned officers in the US Army
 Bethany Lutheran College, a private Christian liberal arts college in Mankato, Minnesota
 Bethesda Lutheran Communities, a Wisconsin-based non-profit serving people with intellectual and developmental disabilities, now known as AbleLight
 Big League Chew, a brand of bubble-gum originally created by the Wrigley Company
 Binary lambda calculus (or Binary combinatory logic), a concept in information theory
 Bloodline Champions, a video game released in 2011 by Stunlock Studios
 Boston Library Consortium, a New England academic library consortium
 Boundary layer control, a concept in aircraft wing design
 Brant Lake Camp, a sleep-away summer camp in Brant Lake, New York, U.S.
 Breakthrough Listen Candidate, a candidate SETI signal detected by the Breakthrough Listen project
 Buxton & Leek College, a further education college in the East Midlands of the UK

See also